Waverley may refer to:

Arts and entertainment
Waverley (novel), by Sir Walter Scott
Waverley Overture, a work by Hector Berlioz inspired by Scott's novel
 Waverley Harrison, a character in the New Zealand soap opera Shortland Street
 Bernice Waverley, a character in the Australian series City Homicide

Places

Australia

New South Wales 

Waverley, New South Wales, a local government area and suburb of Sydney
Electoral district of Waverley, New South Wales, a former electoral district
Waverley Cemetery, in the suburbs of Sydney, New South Wales

Queensland 

Waverley, Queensland, a locality in the Boulia Shire

Tasmania 

Waverley, Tasmania, a suburb of Launceston

Victoria 

Waverley Province, Victoria, a former electorate of the Victorian Legislative Council
City of Waverley, Victoria, a local government area from 1857 to 1994

Western Australia 

Waverley, Western Australia, an abandoned goldfields town also known as Siberia
 Waverley, a local name of Cannington, Western Australia, East Cannington and Beckenham

Canada
 Waverley, Nova Scotia, a suburban community in the Halifax Regional Municipality
 Waverley Park (Thunder Bay), a municipal park in Thunder Bay, Ontario
 Waverley (electoral district), an electoral district in Manitoba
 Rural Municipality of Waverley No. 44, Saskatchewan

New Zealand
 Waverley, Otago, a suburb of Dunedin
 Waverley, Taranaki, a small town

South Africa
 Waverley, Johannesburg
 Waverley, Bloemfontein
 Waverley, Pretoria
 Waverley, Mpumalanga, a small border crossing between South Africa and Eswatini

United Kingdom
 Waverley, South Yorkshire, a region of Rotherham, England
 Borough of Waverley, a borough in Surrey, England
 Waverley Abbey, after which the borough is named

United States
 Waverly (Marriottsville, Maryland), also spelled Waverley, listed on the National Register of Historic Places (NRHP)
 Waverley (Morgantown, Maryland), listed on the NRHP
 Waverley, a neighborhood in Belmont, Massachusetts
 Waverley (West Point, Mississippi), a National Historic Landmark
 Waverley Historic District (Enid, Oklahoma), listed on the NRHP

Schools
 Waverley College, a Catholic secondary school for boys in Sydney, Australia
 Waverley Christian College, Melbourne, Australia, an inter-denominational, co-educational independent Christian school
 Waverley School, Birmingham, England, a mixed all-through school
 Waverley School, former name of Harris Girls' Academy East Dulwich, London, England
 Waverley Girls' High School, Waverley, Johannesburg, South Africa

Transportation
 GWR Waverley Class, a class of Great Western Railway broad-gauge steam locomotives, England
 Edinburgh Waverley railway station, the main railway station in Edinburgh, Scotland
 Waverley Route, former railway line in Scotland, later reinstated between Edinburgh and Tweedbank
 Waverley (passenger train), an express train from London St Pancras to Edinburgh Waverley which ceased operating in 1968
 Waverley Bridge, a road bridge in Edinburgh, Scotland
 PS Waverley, a paddle steamer based on the River Clyde in Scotland
 Waverley Bus Depot, in the Sydney, Australia suburb of Bondi Junction
 Waverley Rail Trail, a combined shared-use path for cyclists and pedestrians and on-road bicycle route in the suburbs of Melbourne, Australia
 Winnipeg Route 80, known locally as Waverley Street, Winnipeg, Manitoba, Canada
 Waverley (MBTA station), a transit station in Belmont, Massachusetts, United States

Australian sports
 Waverley Football Club, an Australian rules football club from 1961 until 1987, based in the Melbourne suburb of Glen Waverley
 Waverley Rugby Club, based in Waverley, New South Wales
 Waverley Cricket Club, former longtime name of Eastern Suburbs Cricket Club, a wandering cricket team from the Surrey/Hants area
 Waverley Baseball Club, based in Glen Waverley
 Waverley Hockey Club, based in the suburbs of Melbourne
 Waverley Park, a disused sporting stadium in Melbourne, formerly used for Australian rules football, now a training venue

Other uses
 Waverley Root (1903-1982), American journalist and writer
 Viscount Waverley, a title in the peerage of the United Kingdom
 Waverley Country Club, Portland, Oregon, United States
 The Waverley pen nib, made by Macniven and Cameron, a popular 19th-century writing instrument named after the Waverley novels

See also
 Pope-Waverley, early 20th-century automobiles made in Indiana, U.S.
 Waverly (disambiguation)
 Wavorly